The Reggiane Re.2004 was an Italian single-engined monoplane made by Reggiane and designed by Roberto Longhi. The aircraft never passed the preliminary stages.

Design and development
The Re.2004 had identical fuselage, wings and other components to the Re.2005. The Re.2004 was powered by an air-cooled Isotta Fraschini Zeta RC 24/60 engine, with 24 cylinders arranged in an X-pattern, producing .

In 1942, a prototype was built, and ten models were ordered; the order was later cancelled due to unresolved engine overheating problems. However, by this time, the Re.2005 had been completed.

Specifications

References

Notes

Bibliography

1940s Italian fighter aircraft